Neubourg Abbey ( or du Neubourg;) is a former Cistercian monastery in Alsace, France, in Dauendorf, about 9 km west of Haguenau in the Bas-Rhin department.

History 
Neubourg Abbey was founded not earlier than 1130 and not later than 1133 by Count Reinhold of Lützelburg as a daughter house of Lützel Abbey of the filiation of Morimond; it was also settled by monks from Lützel. In its turn Neubourg was the mother house of Maulbronn Abbey and Herrenalb Abbey, both founded in 1147.

Between the 14th and 17th centuries the abbey was destroyed and rebuilt several times. It was suppressed in 1790 during the French Revolution.

Inquisition
Not long after it was founded, the abbey was the subject of an inquisition by Frederick Barbarossa, who forced the monks to renounce their claims to the valuable Hohenstaufen Forest.

Buildings
The church was dedicated in 1158. It was rebuilt in 1758, but was entirely destroyed in 1818 along with virtually all of the monastic building complex. There are very few remains: a Baroque gatehouse of 1744; a mill; and part of the precinct wall. Some rococo items from the abbey church (the choir stalls, the organ case, statues of saints) are to be found in the nearby St. Nicholas' church, Haguenau.

Sundial
The abbey possessed a unique 24-faced gnomonic 18th-century sundial, which was relocated to Mont Sainte-Odile Abbey in 1935.

Notes

References
Peugniez, Bernard, nd: Routier cistercien (2nd ed., p. 11). Moisenay: Éditions Gaud. 
Schneider, Ambrosius, 1986: Lexikale Übersicht der Männerklöster der Cistercienser im deutschen Sprach- und Kulturraum, in: Schneider, Ambrosius; Wienand, Adam; Bickel, Wolfgang; Coester, Ernst (eds.): Die Cistercienser, Geschichte – Geist – Kunst, 3rd edn., p. 679). Cologne: Wienand Verlag.

External links 
Dauendorf Community website: page on Neubourg Abbey 

Cistercian monasteries in France
Christian monasteries in Bas-Rhin
Churches in Bas-Rhin
Christian monasteries established in the 12th century
1130 establishments in Europe
1130s establishments in France
1790 disestablishments in France